John Wesley Matthews, Jr. (born April 21, 1940) is a former Democratic member of the South Carolina Senate, representing the 39th District from 1985 to 2020.

External links
South Carolina Legislature - Senator John W. Matthews Jr. official SC Senate website
Project Vote Smart - Senator John W. Matthews Jr. (SC) profile
Follow the Money - John W. Matthews Jr.
2006 2004 2002 2000 1996 campaign contributions

1940 births
Living people
People from Orangeburg County, South Carolina
Methodists from South Carolina
African-American state legislators in South Carolina
Democratic Party South Carolina state senators
21st-century American politicians